Orphan Knoll is a undersea peak, horst and continental fragment located in the Atlantic Ocean off the northeast coast of Newfoundland, with mounds on it rising up to 1,800 meters from the surface. It was above sea level in the Middle Jurassic Period, and was left behind when Europe and Labrador separated during the formation of the North Atlantic, thus giving the peak its name. Due to its isolation, it is a hotspot for marine life and is home to corals, sponges, and endemics.

References 

Landforms of Newfoundland and Labrador
Seamounts of Canada
Continental fragments
Middle Jurassic North America
Middle Jurassic Europe

Horsts (geology)